is a Japanese manga series written and illustrated by Kaori Ozaki. It was serialized in Kodansha's Monthly Afternoon from March to July 2013, with its chapters collected in a single tankōbon volume. It was licensed in North America for English release by Vertical.

Publication
The Gods Lie is written and illustrated by Kaori Ozaki. The series' five chapters ran in Kodansha's Monthly Afternoon from March 25 to July 25, 2013. Kodansha collected the chapters in a single tankōbon volume, released on September 20, 2013.

In North America, Vertical licensed the series for English release in 2015. The volume was released on April 19, 2016.

See also
The Golden Sheep, another manga series by the same author

References

Further reading

External links
 

Coming-of-age anime and manga
Kodansha manga
Seinen manga
Vertical (publisher) titles